Kaldarreh-ye Olya (also Romanized as Kaldarreh-ye ‘Olyā; also known as Gol Darreh and Kaldarreh) is a village in Reza Mahalleh Rural District, in the Central District of Rudsar County, Gilan Province, Iran. At the 2006 census, its population was 681, in 202 families.

References 

Populated places in Rudsar County